Basketball events were contested at the 1995 Summer Universiade in Fukuoka, Japan.

Medal summary

References
 Universiade basketball medalists on HickokSports
 Universiade 1995

Universiade
1995 Summer Universiade
1995
Universiade